was a Japanese politician and writer who was Governor of Tokyo from 1999 to 2012. Being the former leader of the radical right Japan Restoration Party, he was one of the most prominent ultranationalists in modern Japanese politics. An ultranationalist, he was infamous for his misogynistic comments, racist remarks, xenophobic views and hatred of Chinese and Koreans, including using the antiquated pejorative term "sangokujin".

Also a critic of relations between Japan and the United States, his arts career included a prize-winning novel, best-sellers, and work also in theater, film, and journalism. His 1989 book, The Japan That Can Say No, co-authored with Sony chairman Akio Morita (released in 1991 in English), called on the authors' countrymen to stand up to the United States.

After an early career as a writer and film director, Ishihara served in the House of Councillors from 1968 to 1972, in the House of Representatives from 1972 to 1995, and as Governor of Tokyo from 1999 to 2012. He resigned from the governorship to briefly co-lead the Sunrise Party, then joined the Japan Restoration Party and returned to the House of Representatives in the 2012 general election. He unsuccessfully sought re-election in the general election of November 2014, and officially left politics the following month.

Early life and artistic career 
Shintaro Ishihara was born in Suma-ku, Kobe. His father Kiyoshi was an employee, later a general manager, of a shipping company. Shintaro grew up in Zushi, Kanagawa. In 1952, he entered Hitotsubashi University, and he graduated in 1956. Just two months before graduation, Ishihara won the Akutagawa Prize (Japan's most prestigious literary prize) for the novel Season of the Sun. His brother Yujiro played a supporting role in the movie adaptation of the novel (for which Shintaro wrote the screenplay). Ishihara had dabbled in directing a couple of films starring his brother. Regarding these early years as a filmmaker, he said to a Playboy Magazine interviewer in 1990 that "If I had remained a movie director, I can assure you that I would have at least become a better one than Akira Kurosawa".

In the early 1960s, he concentrated on writing, including plays, novels, and a musical version of Treasure Island. One of his later novels, Lost Country (1982), speculated about Japan under the control of the Soviet Union. He also ran a theatre company, and found time to visit the North Pole, race his yacht The Contessa and cross South America on a motorcycle. He wrote a memoir of his journey, Nanbei Odan Ichiman Kiro.

From 1966 to 1967, he covered the Vietnam War at the request of Yomiuri Shimbun, and the experience influenced his decision to enter politics. He also was mentored by the influential author and political "fixer" Tsûsai Sugawara.

Political career 
In 1968, Ishihara ran as a candidate on the Liberal Democratic Party (LDP) national slate for the House of Councillors. He placed first on the LDP list with an unprecedented 3 million votes. After four years in the upper house, Ishihara ran for the House of Representatives representing the second district of Tokyo, and again won election.

In 1973, he joined with thirty other LDP lawmakers in the anti-communist Seirankai or "Blue Storm Group"; the group gained notoriety for sealing a pledge of unity in their own blood.

Ishihara ran for Governor of Tokyo in 1975 but lost to the popular Socialist incumbent Ryokichi Minobe. Minobe was 71 at the time, and Ishihara criticized him as being "too old".

Ishihara returned to the House of Representatives afterward, and worked his way up the party's internal ladder, serving as Director-General of the Environment Agency under Takeo Fukuda (1976) and Minister of Transport under Noboru Takeshita (1989). During the 1980s, Ishihara was a highly visible and popular LDP figure, but was unable to win enough internal support to form a true faction and move up the national political ladder. In 1983 his campaign manager put up stickers throughout Tokyo stating that Ishihara's political opponent was an immigrant from North Korea. Ishihara denied that this was discrimination, saying that the public had a right to know.

In 1989, shortly after losing a highly contested race for the party presidency, Ishihara came to the attention of the West through his book The Japan That Can Say No, co-authored with Sony chairman Akio Morita. The book called on his fellow countrymen to stand up to the United States.

Governor of Tokyo 

In the 1999 Tokyo gubernatorial election, he ran on an independent platform and was elected as Governor of Tokyo. Among Ishihara's moves as governor, he:
 Cut metropolitan spending projects, including plans for a new Toei Subway line, and proposed the sale or leasing out of many metropolitan facilities.
 Imposed a new tax on banks' gross profits (rather than net profits).
 Imposed a new hotel tax based on occupancy.
 Imposed restrictions on the operation of diesel-powered vehicles, following a highly publicized event where he held up a bottle of diesel soot before cameras and reporters.
 Imposed cap and trade energy tax.
 Proposed opening casinos in the Odaiba district.
 Declared in 2005 that Tokyo would bid for the 2016 Summer Olympics, which discouraged a bid by Fukuoka. Tokyo's bid lost to that of Rio de Janeiro.
 Set up the ShinGinko Tokyo bank to lend to SMEs (small medium enterprises) in Tokyo. This bank has lost approximately 1 billion dollars worth of taxpayers' money through inadequate customer risk assessments.
 Served as Chairman of Tokyo's successful bid to host the 2020 Summer Olympics.
 Generated controversy from PETA for the culling of the 37,000 crows that populated Tokyo.

He won re-election in 2003 with 70.2% of the vote, and re-election in 2007 with 50.52% of the vote. In the 2011 gubernatorial election, his share of the vote dipped to 43.4% against challenges by comedian Hideo Higashikokubaru and entrepreneur Miki Watanabe.

On 25 October 2012, Ishihara announced he would resign as Governor of Tokyo to form a new political party in preparation for upcoming national elections. Following his announcement, the Tokyo Metropolitan Assembly approved his resignation on 31 October 2012, officially ending his tenure as Governor of Tokyo for 4,941 days, the second-longest term after Shunichi Suzuki.

Sunrise Party
Ishihara's new national party was expected to be formed with members of the right-wing Sunrise Party of Japan, which he had helped to set up in 2010. When announced by co-leaders Ishihara and SPJ chief Takeo Hiranuma on 13 November 2012, Sunrise Party incorporated all five members of SPJ. SP would look to form a coalition with other small parties including Osaka Mayor Toru Hashimoto's Japan Restoration Party (Nippon Ishin no Kai).

In November 2012, Ishihara and his co-leader Hiranuma said that the Sunrise Party would pursue "establishment of an independent Constitution, beefing up of Japan's defense capabilities, and fundamental reform of fiscal management and tax systems to make them more transparent". The future of nuclear power and the upcoming consumption tax hike were issues it would have to address with potential coalition partners.

Sunrise Party merger with the Japan Restoration Party
Only four days after the Sunrise Party was launched, on 17 November 2012, Ishihara and Tōru Hashimoto, leader of the Japan Restoration Party (JRP), decided to merge their parties, with Ishihara becoming the head of the JRP. Your Party would not join the party, nor would Genzei Nippon, as the latter party's anti-consumption tax increase policy did not match the JRP's pro-consumption tax policy.

Reporting on a poll in early December 2012, Asahi Shimbun characterized the merger with Japan Restoration Party as the latter having "swallowed up" Sunrise. The poll, in advance of the 16 December Lower House elections, also said the association with SP could hurt JRP's chances of forming a ruling coalition even though JRP was showing strength relative to the ruling DPJ.

Party for Future Generations 
In the December 2014 general elections he was a candidate for the Party for Future Generations, an extreme right-wing party, but was defeated. Following this, he retired from politics.

Political views 
Ishihara is generally described as having been one of Japan's most prominent extreme right-wing politicians. He was called "Japan's Le Pen" on a program broadcast on Australia's ABC. He was affiliated with the openly ultranationalist organization Nippon Kaigi.

Foreign relations 
Ishihara was a long-term friend of the prominent Aquino family in the Philippines.  He is credited with being been the first person to inform future President Corazon Aquino about the assassination of her husband Senator Benigno Aquino Jr. on 21 August 1983.

Ishihara was often critical of Japan's foreign policy as being non-assertive. Regarding Japan's relationship with the U.S., he stated that "The country I dislike most in terms of U.S.–Japan ties is Japan, because it's a country that can't assert itself." As part of the criticism, Ishihara published a book co-authored with the then Prime minister of Malaysia, Mahathir Mohamad, titled "No" to ieru Ajia – tai Oubei e no hōsaku in 1994.

Ishihara was also long critical of the government of the People's Republic of China. He invited the Dalai Lama and the President of the Republic of China Lee Teng-hui to Tokyo.

Ishihara was deeply interested in the North Korean abduction issue, and called for economic sanctions against North Korea. Following Ishihara's campaign to bid Tokyo for the 2016 Summer Olympics, he eased his criticism of the PRC government. He accepted an invitation to attend the 2008 Summer Olympics in Beijing, and was selected as a torch-bearer for the Japan leg of the 2008 Olympic Torch Relay.

Views on foreigners in Japan 
On 9 April 2000, in a speech before a Self-Defense Forces group, Ishihara said crimes were repeatedly committed by illegally entered people, using the pejorative term sangokujin, and foreigners. He also speculated that in the event a natural disaster struck the Tokyo area, they would be likely to cause civil disorder. His comment invoked calls for his resignation, demands for an apology and fears among residents of Korean descent in Japan, as well as being criticised by the UN Committee on the Elimination of Racial Discrimination.

Regarding this statement, Ishihara later said:

On 20 February 2006, Ishihara also said: "Roppongi is now virtually a foreign neighborhood. Africans—I don't mean African-Americans—who don't speak English are there doing who knows what. This is leading to new forms of crime such as car theft. We should be letting in people who are intelligent."

On 17 April 2010, Ishihara said "many veteran lawmakers in the ruling-coalition parties are naturalized or the offspring of people naturalized in Japan".

Other controversial statements 
In 1990, Ishihara said in a Playboy interview that the Rape of Nanking was a fiction, claiming, "People say that the Japanese made a holocaust but that is not true. It is a story made up by the Chinese.  It has tarnished the image of Japan, but it is a lie." He continued to defend this statement in the uproar that ensued. He also backed the film The Truth about Nanjing, a Japanese film that denies the atrocity.

In 2000, Ishihara, one of the eight judges for a literary prize, commented that homosexuality is abnormal, which caused an outrage in the gay community in Japan.

In a 2001 interview with women's magazine Shukan Josei, Ishihara said that he believed "old women who live after they have lost their reproductive function are useless and are committing a sin," adding that he "couldn't say this as a politician." He was criticized in the Tokyo Metropolitan Assembly for these comments, but responded that the criticism was driven by "tyrant… old women."

During an inauguration of a university building in 2004, Ishihara stated that French is unqualified as an international language because it is "a language in which nobody can count", referring to the counting system in French, which is based on units of twenty for numbers from 70 to 99 rather than ten (as is the case in Japanese and English). The statement led to a lawsuit from several language schools in 2005. Ishihara subsequently responded to comments that he did not disrespect French culture by professing his love of French literature on Japanese TV news.

At a Tokyo IOC press briefing in 2009, Governor Ishihara dismissed a letter sent by environmentalist Paul Coleman regarding the contradiction of his promoting the Tokyo Olympic 2016 bid as 'the greenest ever' while destroying the forested mountain of Minamiyama, the closest 'Satoyama' to the centre of Tokyo, by angrily stating Coleman was 'Just a foreigner, it does not matter'. Then, on continued questioning by investigative journalist Hajime Yokota, he stated 'Minamiyama is a Devil's Mountain that eats children.' Then he went on to explain how unmanaged forests 'eat children' and implied that Yokota, a Japanese national, was betraying his nation by saying 'What nationality are you anyway?' This was recorded on film and turned into a video that was sent around the world as the Save Minamiyama Movement

In 2010, Ishihara claimed that Korea under Japanese rule was absolutely justified due to historical pressures from Qing dynasty and Imperial Russia.

In reference to the 2011 Tōhoku earthquake and tsunami and the subsequent Fukushima Daiichi nuclear disaster, Ishihara said "that the triple disaster was 'punishment from heaven' because Japanese have become greedy".

However, he also commented that the victims of triple disaster in whole country were pitiable.

This speech quickly caused many controversies and critical responses from the public opinion, both inside and outside Japan. The governor of Miyagi expressed displeasure about Ishihara's speech, claimed that Ishihara should have considered the victims of the disaster. Ishihara then had to apologize for his comments.

During the 2012 Summer Olympics, Ishihara stated that "Westerners practicing judo resembles beasts fighting. Internationalized judo has lost its appeal." He added, "In Brazil they put chocolate in norimaki, but I wouldn't call it sushi. Judo has gone the same way."

Ishihara has said that Japan ought to have nuclear weapons.

Proposal to buy the Senkaku/Diaoyu Islands 
On 15 April 2012, Ishihara made a speech in Washington, D.C., publicly stating his desire for Tokyo to purchase the Senkaku Islands, called the Diaoyu Islands by mainland China, on behalf of Japan in an attempt to end the territorial dispute between China and Japan, causing uproars in Chinese society and increasing tension between the governments of China and Japan. The government of Japan bought the islands in an effort to preempt the provocative bid, although the Chinese side viewed the purchase as an effort by Japan to bring the islands under Japanese sovereignty.

Personal life 
Ishihara was married to Noriko Ishihara and had four sons. Members of the House of Representatives Nobuteru Ishihara and Hirotaka Ishihara are his eldest and third sons; actor and weatherman Yoshizumi Ishihara is his second son. His youngest son, Nobuhiro Ishihara, is a painter. Actor Yujiro Ishihara was his younger brother.

In April 2011, Ishihawa has also Fukushima survivor amidst 11 March 2011 earthquake, tsunami, and nuclear disaster in Japan.

Illness and death 
In January 2022, Ishihawa has diagnosed with pancreatic cancer. He died at his home in Tokyo on 1 February 2022, at the age of 89.

Books written by Ishihara 

 Taiyō no kisetsu (太陽の季節), Season of the Sun, Winner of the Akutagawa Prize, 1956
 Kurutta kajitsu (狂った果実),  Crazed Fruit, 1956
 Kanzen Na Yuugi (完全な遊戯), The Perfect Game, 1956
 Umi no chizu (海の地図), Map of the Sea, 1958
 Seinen no ki (青年の樹), Tree of the Youth, 1959
 Gesshoku (月蝕), Lunar Eclipse, 1959
 Nanbei ōdan ichi man kiro (南米横断1万キロ), 10 Thousand Kilometers Motoring across South America
 Seishun to wa nanda (青春とはなんだ), What does Youth Mean?, 1965
 Ōinaru umi e (大いなる海へ), To the Great Sea, 1965
 Kaeranu umi (還らぬ海), Unretreating Sea,  1966
 Suparuta kyōiku (スパルタ教育), Spartan education, 1969
 Kaseki no mori (化石の森),  Petrified Forest, Minister of Education Prize, 1970
 Shintarō no seiji chousho (慎太郎の政治調書), Shintaro's Political Record, 1970
 Shintarō no daini seiji chousho (慎太郎の第二政治調書), Shintaro's Second Political Record, 1971
 Shin Wakan rōeishū (新和漢朗詠集), New Wakan rōeishū (Collection of Japanese and Chinese poems), 1973
 Yabanjin no daigaku (野蛮人の大学), University of Barbarians, 1977
 Boukoku -Nihon no totsuzenshi (亡国 -日本の突然死), The Ruin of a Nation - Japan's Sudden Death, 1982
  'Nō' to ieru Nihon  (「NO」と言える日本), The Japan That Can Say No (in collaboration with Akio Morita), 1989
 Soredemo 'Nō' to ieru Nihon. Nichibeikan no konponmondai (それでも「NO」と言える日本 ―日米間の根本問題―), The Japan That Still Can Say No - Principal problem of the Japan–US relations (in collaboration with Shōichi Watanabe and Kazuhisa Ogawa), 1990
 Waga jinsei no toki no toki (わが人生の時の時), The Sublime Moment of my Life, 1990
 Danko 'No' to ieru Nihon (断固「NO」と言える日本), The Japan That Can Strongly Say No (in collaboration with Jun Etō), 1991
 Mishima Yukio no nisshoku (三島由紀夫の日蝕), The Eclipse of Yukio Mishima, 1991
  'No' to ieru Asia (「NO」と言えるアジア)，The Asia That Can Say NO (in collaboration with Mahathir Mohamad), 1994
 Kaze ni tsuite no kioku (風についての記憶), My Memory about the Wind, 1994
 Otōto (弟), Younger brother, Mainichi Publishing Culture Award Special Award, 1996
  'Chichi' nakushite kuni tatazu  ("父"なくして国立たず), No Country can Stand without "Father", 1997
 Sensen fukoku 'Nō' to ieru Nihon keizai -Amerika no kin'yū dorei kara no kaihō- (宣戦布告「NO」と言える日本経済 ―アメリカの金融奴隷からの解放―), Declaration of War, Economy of Japan That Can Say No - Liberation from America's financial slavery, 1998
 Hokekyō o ikiru(法華経を生きる), To Live the Lotus Sutra, 1998
 Seisan (聖餐), Eucharist, 1999
 Kokka naru gen'ei (国家なる幻影), An Illusion called Nation, 1999
 Amerika shinkō wo suteyo 2001 nen kara no nihon senryaku (「アメリカ信仰」を捨てよ ―2001年からの日本戦略), Stop worshipping America - Japan strategy from 2001, 2000
 Boku wa kekkon shinai (僕は結婚しない), I Won't Marry, 2001
 Ima 'Tamashii' no kyōiku (いま「魂」の教育), Now, 'Spirit' Education, 2001
 Ei'en nare, nihon -moto sōri to tochiji no katariai (永遠なれ、日本 -元総理と都知事の語り合い), Japan Forever – A Talk between Ex-Premier and Tokyo governor (in collaboration with Yasuhiro Nakasone), 2001
 Oite koso jinsei (老いてこそ人生), To get Old is the Life, 2002
 Hi no shima (火の島), Island of Fire, 2008
 Watashi no suki na nihonjin (私の好きな日本人), My Favorite Japanese People, 2008
 Saisei(再生), Recovery, 2010
 Shin Darakuron -Gayoku to tenbatsu (新・堕落論-我欲と天罰),New "On Decadance" - Greed and Divine Punishment, 2011

Translation work
 Robert Ringer: Winning Through Intimidation, 1978

Translations in English
 The Japan That Can Say No (in collaboration with Akio Morita), Simon & Schuster, 1991, .  Touchstone Books, 1992, . Cassette version . Disk version, 1993, .

Film career 
He acted in six films, including Crazed Fruit (1956) and The Hole (1957), and co-directed the 1962 film Love at Twenty (with François Truffaut, Marcel Ophüls, Renzo Rossellini and Andrzej Wajda).

Honours 
 Akutagawa Prize (1956)
  Grand Cordon of the Order of the Rising Sun (2015)

See also 

 Ethnic issues in Japan

References

External links 

 Sensen Fukoku (Declaration of War) – Ishihara's official website (in Japanese)
 
 Fackler, Martin, "A Fringe Politician Moves to Japan's National Stage", New York Times, 9 December 2012. "Shintaro Ishihara, a novelist turned political firebrand, promises to restore Japan's battered national pride."
 J'Lit | Authors : Shintaro Ishihara | Books from Japan

|-

|-

|-

 
1932 births
2022 deaths
People from Kobe
Politicians from Kanagawa Prefecture
Explorers of the Arctic
Gambling in Japan
Ministers of Transport of Japan
Governors of Tokyo
Hitotsubashi University alumni
Far-right politics in Japan
Japan Restoration Party politicians
21st-century Japanese politicians
Japanese actor-politicians
Japanese anti-communists
Japanese nationalists
Japanese dramatists and playwrights
Japanese male film actors
Japanese mystery writers
Japanese polar explorers
20th-century Japanese novelists
21st-century Japanese novelists
Japanese Shintoists
Japanese theatre managers and producers
Japanese war correspondents
Liberal Democratic Party (Japan) politicians
Members of the House of Councillors (Japan)
Members of the House of Representatives (Japan)
Japanese memoirists
Nanjing Massacre deniers
Right-wing populism in Japan
Treasure Island
War correspondents of the Vietnam War
Akutagawa Prize winners
Members of Nippon Kaigi
Party for Japanese Kokoro politicians
Nichiren Buddhists
Recipients of the Order of Brilliant Star
Historical revisionism of Comfort women
Historical negationism
Deaths from cancer in Japan
Deaths from pancreatic cancer